Ambili Devi is an actress from Kerala, India who appeared in many Malayalam cinema and serials. She has established herself as a lead actress in Malayalam Television Industry and has won the Kerala State Television Award for Best Actress in 2005.

Acting career 

She started as a young Malayalam Serial artist and got her break with the serial Samayam. Later, she entered the movie industry after she became 'Kalathilakam' in the Kerala State School Youth Festival in 2001. Her notable role in Malayalam was Meerayude Dukhavum Muthuvinte Swapnavum, where she played Meera the disabled sister of the protogonist, Muthu played by Prithvi Raj.

Personal life 

Ambili is the daughter of Balachandran Pillai and Maheswari Amma of Gigi Bhavan at Chavara, Kottamkulangara near Kollam district. She has an elder sister Anjali Devi. She had her education from vidyarambham nursery school, Government vocational higher secondary school kottamkulangara, Govt HSS Chavara. She pursued BA literature from Fatima Mata National College, Kollam. She gained a diploma and MA in Bharathanatyam from Kalai Kaviri College of Finearts, Trichy.

Ambili was first married to film-serial cameraman Lovel, hailing from Thiruvananthapuram on 27 March 2009 at Kollam Bank Auditorium and the couple has a son, Amarnath born on 27 January 2013. However, The couple got divorced in 2018. She got married for the second time to serial actor Adithyan Jayan on 25 January 2019. They have a son born on 20 November 2019. However, Adithyan and Ambili got divorced on 2021.

She is a trained dancer in Bharatanyatyam, Kuchipudi,  Mohiniyattam & Folk dance. She runs a dance school, named Nrityodaya School of Dance and Music.

Filmography

Television Serials

Albums

 Fathima Beevi
 Sulthan
 Sree Bhadrakali
 Manathe Ambili
 Kairali Sravanam
 Amme Kaithozham
 Mrithyunjayam
 Ponmaninadham
 Moovanthipottu
 Kairali Sravanam
 Kodungallur Punya Darshanam
 Hara Hara Shambo
 Devi Kripa
 Chakkulathu Punya Darsanam
 Devimalarukal
 Kadampuzha Punya Darsanam

TV Shows

As a host
Fresh'n'Hits (Kairali TV)
Shoot and show (Kairali TV)
Nalla Paatukkal (Doordarshan)
Shubharathri (Jeevan TV)
Hridayaragam (Asianet Plus)
Dance Dance (Asianet Plus)
Sindooram (Surya TV)
Ambili's World  (YouTube)

Other shows

 Madhuram Shobhanam
 Oruchiri Iruchiri Bumperchiri Aaghosham
 Urvashi Theaters
 Laughing Villa
 JB Junction
 Fast Track
 Super Challenge
 Saphalameeyathra
 Don't Do Don't Do
 Annies Kitchen
 Asianet News
 Manassiloru Mazhavillu
 Onnum Onnum Moonnu
 Ruchimelam
 Tamaar Padaar
 Chat with Star
 Marunadan Malayali
 Malayali Life
 Lal Salam
 December Mist
 Aram + Aram = Kinnaram - promo
 FAQ
 Day with a Star
 Thararasakoottu
 Athithikkoppam
 Swapnaveedu
 Manoramaonline  Celebrity Chats
 Manoramaonline  Astrology
 Flowers Award Nite
 Onam Vanne Ponnonam Vanne
 Marhaba

References

External links

Living people
A
Indian film actresses
Actresses in Malayalam cinema
Indian television actresses
Actresses in Malayalam television
Actresses in Tamil cinema
20th-century Indian actresses
21st-century Indian actresses
Kerala State Television Award winners
Year of birth missing (living people)